The FC Basel 1903–04 season was their eleventh season in their existence. The club's chairman was Ernst-Alfred Thalmann, who took over the chairmanship at the AGM for the third time in the club's history. FC Basel played their home games in the Landhof in the Quarter Kleinbasel.

Overview 
With over 40 active footballers and over 70 patron members Basel were the second largest club in Switzerland at this time, larger was only Grasshopper Club Zürich. Basel's first team played in the Serie A and the second team in the Serie B.

Daniel Hug (the team's most prominent, their best and their largest player) was named as team captain and as captain he led the team trainings and was responsible for the line-ups. Together with goalkeeper Paul Hofer, the players Alphonse Schorpp, Eugen Strauss, Dr. Siegfried Pfeiffer, Ernst-Alfred Thalmann and Emil Hasler, Hug was one of many early national team players who came from the Basel team.

The team played just one pre-season friendly at home against Grasshopper Club. There was another mid-season friendly against local lower tier Nordstern Basel. During the winter break Basel played two more friendly matches. These were the return game against the Grasshoppers which was drawn 6–6 and also an away game against west group team Montriond Lausanne which was won 3–2. At the end of the season Basel played against group winners Old Boys, which was played as warm up the finals. They also played a match against French club Mulhouse, which was lost 6–8, the highest scoring game of the season.

The Swiss Serie A season 1903–04 was divided into three regional groups, east, central and west. Basel were allocated to the central group together with the Young Boys, FC Bern, Floria Biel/Bienne, and two further teams from Basel, Old Boys Basel and Fortuna Basel. Having lost their first six games of the season, local team Fortuna Basel opted out of the league season after the New Year and  gave forfait for all their remaining games. FC Basel ended their ten games with five victories, two draws and three defeats in third position in the league table, obtaining 12 points, scoring 28 and conceding 25 goals. The Young Boys and the Old Boys ended level on points and so a play-off match was arranged. The Old Boys won the play-off 3–2 and therefore qualified for the finals. 

In the finals St. Gallen first drew 1–1 against group west winners Servette, then they won 1–0 against central group winners Old Boys and because the Old Boys beat Servette 2–0, St. Gallen won their first ever championship title.

Players

Results 

Legend

Friendly matches

Pre-season

Winter break and end of season

Serie A

Central group matches

Central group league table 

 Note to Fortuna Basel

See also
 History of FC Basel
 List of FC Basel players
 List of FC Basel seasons

Notes

Footnotes 

1903–1904 season matches: Bern-FCB, FCB-OB

References

Sources 
 Rotblau: Jahrbuch Saison 2014/2015. Publisher: FC Basel Marketing AG. 
 Die ersten 125 Jahre. Publisher: Josef Zindel im Friedrich Reinhardt Verlag, Basel. 
 Switzerland 1903-04 at RSSSF
(NB: Despite all efforts, the editors of these books and the authors in "Basler Fussballarchiv" have failed to be able to identify all the players, their date and place of birth or date and place of death, who played in the games during the early years of FC Basel. Most of the documentation is missing.)

External links
 FC Basel official site

FC Basel seasons
Basel